First Congregational Church, also known as First Congregational United Church of Christ, is an historic church located at 431 Columbus Avenue in Sandusky, Ohio. Designed in the Romanesque Revival style of architecture, it was  built in 1895 by Sandusky builder George Philip Feick (1849-1932).  On October 20, 1982, it was added to the National Register of Historic Places. First Congregational is still an active member of the United Church of Christ.

References

Churches on the National Register of Historic Places in Ohio
Romanesque Revival church buildings in Ohio
Churches completed in 1895
Churches in Erie County, Ohio
National Register of Historic Places in Erie County, Ohio
United Church of Christ churches in Ohio